Fotbal Club Delta Tulcea, commonly known as Delta Tulcea, was a professional football club from Tulcea, Romania, originally founded in 1973, then refounded in 2005, 2013, and 2021. The club was last time enrolled in the Liga IV, fourth tier of the Romanian Football League System.

History

The club was founded in 1973 as Fotbal Club Delta Tulcea then reorganized in 2005. The club's first president in the new format was Petre Marinescu since May 20, 2006.

In their first season after the reorganization, the team played in the Romanian third league (Liga III), where they would win the league's second series by a margin of twenty points from the runner-up, CSM Ramnicu Sarat. The manager behind this success was Constantin Gache.

After having promoted to the second league (Liga II), with the addition of a few new players, and the same coach, the team would go on to winning the second league in the 2006–2007 season after managing an eight-win streak. Even so, the team would not promote to the first league (Liga I) due to licensing problems.

It is due to this that the team would lose some of its valuable players at the time, and also its coach that went to the rival team Farul Constanta.

After this, they played in the Liga II until their dissolution in the summer of 2013. The club was refounded as Delta Dobrogea Tulcea in the same year.

Delta withdrew from Liga III during the 2018–19 season after a 60 points penalization due to financial problems, but continue to be active at youth level.

On August 27th 2022, Tulcenii announced that the club will not enroll for the 2022-23 season of Liga IV - Tulcea County due to the financial and organizational problems, but they will continue to focus on youth football.

Honours
Liga II
Winners (1): 2006–07
Liga III
Winners (4): 1970–71, 1971–72, 1976–77, 2005–06
Runners-up (1): 2015–16
Liga IV – Tulcea County
Winners (3): 1994–95, 2004–05, 2013–14

Notable players
The footballers enlisted below have had international cap(s) for their respective countries at junior and/or senior level. Players whose name is listed in bold represented their countries at junior and/or senior level on through the time's passing. Additionally, these players have also had a significant number of caps and goals accumulated throughout a certain number of seasons for the club itself as well.

Romania
  Iulian Olteanu
  Bogdan Pîrvu
  Ştefan Ciobanu
  Cosmin Mărginean
  Alexandru Mățel
  Emil Nanu
  Pavel Peniu
  Andrei Peteleu

Cameroon
  Jean Christian N'Kongue
Nigeria
  Henry Chinonso Ihelewere

References

External links

Tulcea
Football clubs in Tulcea County
Association football clubs established in 1973
Liga II clubs
Liga III clubs
Liga IV clubs
1973 establishments in Romania